The Center on Budget and Policy Priorities (CBPP) is a progressive American think tank that analyzes the impact of federal and state government budget policies. A 501(c)(3) nonprofit organization, the Center's stated mission is to "conduct research and analysis to help shape public debates over proposed budget and tax policies and to help ensure that policymakers consider the needs of low-income families and individuals in these debates."

CBPP was founded in 1981 by Robert Greenstein, a former political appointee in the Jimmy Carter administration. Greenstein founded the organization, which is based in Washington, D.C., to provide an alternative perspective on the social policy initiatives of the Ronald Reagan administration.

Activities
Based in Washington, D.C., the Center was founded in 1981 by Robert Greenstein. In 2013, the Center reported revenue of $37.5 million, expenses of $27.3 million, and total year-end assets of $67.7 million.

In 1993, the Center was involved in the founding of the State Fiscal Analysis Initiative (SFAI), a network of nonprofit, state-level policy organizations that examine state budget and tax policies and their effect on low- and moderate-income households.

In 1997, the Center established the International Budget Partnership (IBP). The IBP publishes an annual Open Budget Index which measures governmental budget transparency and accountability around the world.

In 2005, representatives of CBPP attended a May 2006 meeting of the Democracy Alliance along with the Center for American Progress and the Economic Policy Institute to "talk about the agendas they were busy crafting that would catapult Democratic politics into the economic future."

The Center is opposed to modern day efforts to call a convention to propose amendments to the United States Constitution.

Political stance 
The Center describes itself as "a nonpartisan research and policy institute" with a focus on reducing poverty and inequality. Others have described it as nonpartisan, progressive, liberal, and left-leaning.

Board of directors

Funding
The Center is supported by a number of foundations, including the Annie E. Casey Foundation, the John D. and Catherine T. MacArthur Foundation, and the Ford Foundation, as well as individual donors. The Atlantic Philanthropies is a major donor to CBPP, as is George Soros. CBPP has received funding through the Democracy Alliance. In fiscal year 2012, it accepted $1,533,236 in government grants.

See also
 Brookings Institution
 Democracy Alliance
 The Heritage Foundation
 Tax Foundation
 Urban Institute

References

External links
 
 Organizational Profile – National Center for Charitable Statistics (Urban Institute)
 State Fiscal Analysis Initiative
 International Budget Partnership

 
Political and economic think tanks in the United States
Think tanks based in Washington, D.C.
Organizations established in 1981
1981 establishments in Washington, D.C.
Progressive organizations in the United States